Yuriy Vasylyovych Istomin (Yuriy Vasilyevich Istomin; 3 July 1944 – 6 February 1999) was a Soviet Ukrainian footballer.

Honours
 Soviet Top League winner: 1970.
 UEFA Euro 1972 runner-up: 1972.
 Olympic bronze: 1972.

International career
He earned 34 caps for the USSR national football team, and participated in UEFA Euro 1968 and UEFA Euro 1972. He also earned a bronze medal in football at the 1972 Summer Olympics.

External links
Profile (in Russian)

1944 births
1999 deaths
Footballers from Kharkiv
Ukrainian footballers
Soviet footballers
Soviet Union international footballers
UEFA Euro 1968 players
UEFA Euro 1972 players
Soviet Top League players
FC Metalist Kharkiv players
SKA Kiev players
SKA Lviv players
PFC CSKA Moscow players
Olympic footballers of the Soviet Union
Footballers at the 1972 Summer Olympics
Olympic bronze medalists for the Soviet Union
Olympic medalists in football
Medalists at the 1972 Summer Olympics
Association football defenders